During World War II each unit of the Red Army had a military standard, as required by the Decree on Revolutionary Red Banners of the WPRA Units from 11 June 1926 (superseded by the Decree on the Red Banner of the Military Units of the Red Army from 21 December 1942). The standards were typically in the form of a rectangular red banner with the Soviet state emblem and the unit's name on the front side. The decree required the standard to be present at the battlefield. The loss of the standard "due to faintheartedness" was punishable by court-martial and the disbandment of the military unit. On several occasions the standards were saved at the cost of life or hidden to prevent their capture. However, within months following the invasion of the Soviet Union the Germans captured dozens of Soviet regimental and divisional standards. Some others were later either retrieved or substituted with new ones.

Battalions

Regiments

Divisions

See also
 List of German standards at the Moscow Victory Parade of 1945

References

Soviet military units whose standards were lost in World War II
Soviet military units whose standards were lost in World War II
Military insignia
Military history of the Soviet Union during World War II
Military units and formations of the Soviet Union in World War II
War trophies